Kayaking in India has become a popular sport.

Flat water and sea kayaking
Flat-water kayaking takes place in rivers, lakes and the ocean. Aside from professional flat water kayaking, there is very limited recreational kayaking. Historically, Indian tourists considered kayaking a one-time activity and not a competitive sport.

Long distance flat water kayaking can be done in Mulki, India. Participants from Bangalore, Mangalore, Udupi etc. come to participate in 30 km kayaking and camping adventure.

Whitewater kayaking

Whitewater kayaking is a niche sport with some hardcore following.  While the Himalayan rivers are teeming with largely commercial kayakers and some weekend adventurers, in south it is largely the weekend kayakers who have been driving the sport.  Bangalore, Karnataka has seen the largest spike in weekend paddlers.  However, paddling in India, in general is plagued by limited availability of gear locally, police and bureaucratic interference (who view kayakers with suspicion, since it is an alien activity), and commercial rafters who feel threatened by the presence of the kayakers on the rivers where they have permits to commercially raft.

Sea Kayaking 
Sea kayaking is new to India. Considering the vast coastline of India, extremely less number of people do sea kayaking. Kaustubh Khare hold the long distance record of kayaking west cost of India on a kayak. Few other individuals have also kayaked the coastline of Kerala, Mumbai to Goa, Karnataka and Gujarat. 

There are two school who teach professional sea kayaking in India. 

 KayakBoy located in Mulki, Karnataka(Coastal Kayak training Level 1 - Level 4)
 Quest Adventure Sports Academy(Sea kayak Level 1 - Level III)

References

Further reading
 
 
 
 
 
 
 
 

India
Water sports in India
Adventure tourism in India